The first Bagmati Provincial Assembly was elected by the 2017 provincial elections. 110 members were elected to the assembly, 66 of whom were elected through direct elections and 44 of whom were elected through the party list proportional representation system. The term of the assembly started on 1 February 2018 and ended in September 2022. Dormani Poudel and Astalaxmi Shakya served as the chief ministers from the CPN (UML) and Rajendra Prasad Pandey served as chief minister from CPN (Unified Socialist) during the term of the assembly. Sanu Kumar Shrestha served as the speaker of the assembly and Radhika Tamang served as the deputy speaker.

Composition

Leaders

Office bearers 

 Speaker of the Provincial Assembly: Hon. Sanu Kumar Shrestha
 Deputy Speaker of the Provincial Assembly: Radhika Tamang

 Chief Minister of Bagmati Province
 Hon. Dormani Paudel (CPN (UML)) (until 18 August 2021)
 Hon. Ashta Laxmi Shakya (CPN (UML)) (18 August 2021 – 27 October 2021)
 Hon. Rajendra Prasad Pandey (Communist Party of Nepal (Unified Socialist)) (from 27 October 2021)
 Leader of Opposition
 Indra Bahadur Baniya (Nepali Congress) (until 27 October 2021)
 Ashta Laxmi Shakya (CPN (UML)) (until 27 October 2021)

Parliamentary party leaders 

 Parliamentary party leader of CPN (UML):
 Dormani Paudel (until 18 August 2021)
 Ashta Laxmi Shakya (since 18 August 2021)
 Parliamentary party leader of CPN (Maoist Centre): Shalikram Jamkattel
 Deputy parliamentary party leader of CPN (Maoist Centre): Kumari Moktan
 Parliamentary party leader of Nepali Congress: Indra Bahadur Baniya
 Deputy parliamentary party leader of Nepali Congress: Krishna Lal Bhadel
 Parliamentary party leader of Communist Party of Nepal (Unified Socialist): Rajendra Prasad Pandey
 Deputy parliamentary party leader of Communist Party of Nepal (Unified Socialist): Krishna Prasad Sharma
 Parliamentary party leader of Bibeksheel Sajha Party: Ramesh Paudyal
 Parliamentary party leader of Nepal Majdoor Kisan Party: Surendra Raj Gosai

Whips 

 Chief Whip of CPN (UML): Deepak Niraula
 Chief Whip of CPN (Maoist Centre): Buddhiman Majhi
 Whip (CPN (Maoist Centre)): Pratima Shrestha
 Chief Whip of Nepali Congress: Radha Ghale
 Whip (Nepali Congress): Chhiring Dorje Lama
 Chief Whip of Communist Party of Nepal (Unified Socialist): Munu Sigdel
 Whip (Communist Party of Nepal (Unified Socialist)): Basundhara Humagain

Members

By-elections

See also 

 Bagmati Province
 2017 Nepalese provincial elections

References 

Members of the Provincial Assembly of Bagmati Province